Scott Gregory Marlowe (born Ronald Richard DeLeo; June 24, 1932 – January 6, 2001) was an American actor who had a starring role in the 1957 teen exploitation film The Cool and the Crazy. In 1961 he starred opposite Lola Albright in "A Cold Wind in August." He also appeared as "Les" in the series Straightaway in an episode titled "Die Laughing".

Marlowe guest-starred in the 1960 episode "The Show Off" of Law of the Plainsman as "Clancy James". He also guest-starred in the 1963 episode "Legends Don't Sleep" as "Britt". On Gunsmoke (S9E3) playing a confused young man who is enamored of a paroled killer as a father figure.

Marlowe had important roles in three episodes of Have Gun – Will Travel: "The Hanging of Roy Carter" (S1E4); "Charley Red Dog" (S3E13); and "Duke of Texas" (S4E31)

References

External links 
 

1932 births
2001 deaths
20th-century American male actors
American male film actors
American male stage actors
American male television actors
American people of Italian descent
Bisexual male actors
American LGBT actors
LGBT people from New Jersey
People from Newark, New Jersey
Western (genre) television actors
20th-century American LGBT people